Rokas Jokubaitis (born 19 November 2000) is a Lithuanian professional basketball player for FC Barcelona of the Spanish Liga ACB and the EuroLeague.

Early life and youth career
Jokubaitis was born in Mažeikiai, Lithuania. He grew up playing youth basketball at the Vladas Knašius Basketball School in Klaipėda before moving to the youth academy of Žalgiris. Jokubaitis was named to the all-tournament team at the 2018 Kaunas Tournament after averaging 15 points and 8.3 assists per game and leading Žalgiris to a third-place finish.

Professional career

Žalgiris (2017–2021) 
On 9 January 2018, Jokubaitis scored a game-high 31 points for Žalgiris-2 in a highly publicized exhibition game against LaMelo Ball and Prienai. On 5 May, he made his senior debut for Žalgiris in its Lithuanian Basketball League (LKL) regular season finale against Pieno žvaigždės. In the 2018–19 season, Jokubaitis was named the Best Young Player in the second-tier National Basketball League after averaging 13.2 points, 5.2 assists and 3.4 rebounds per game for Žalgiris-2. 

On 14 June 2019, Jokubaitis signed a three-year contract extension with Žalgiris. In the 2020–21 season, he averaged seven points and 2.5 assists per game in the EuroLeague. Jokubaitis was the runner-up to Usman Garuba for the EuroLeague Rising Star award. He averaged eight points and four assists per game in the LKL and was named Best Young Player of the league.

Barcelona (2021–present) 
On 21 July 2021, Jokubaitis signed a four-year contract with FC Barcelona of the Spanish Liga ACB and the EuroLeague.

NBA draft rights
Jokubaitis was selected with the 34th overall pick by the Oklahoma City Thunder in the 2021 NBA draft. Later on the draft-day, his rights were traded to the New York Knicks. On 3 August 2021, it was announced that Jokubaitis would return to FC Barcelona after the conclusion of the 2021 NBA Summer League.

National team career
Jokubaitis played for Lithuania at the 2016 FIBA U16 European Championship in Poland. He averaged 10 points and helped his team win a silver medal. Jokubaitis was the youngest player at the 2017 FIBA Under-19 World Cup in Egypt, averaging 10 points and 5.3 assists per game for the sixth-place team. At the 2018 FIBA U18 European Championship in Latvia, he averaged 12.9 points and 5.6 rebounds per game as his team finished fifth. Jokubaitis led Lithuania to fourth place at the 2019 FIBA Under-19 World Cup in Greece, where he averaged 11.3 points and 5.6 assists per game.

On 24 February 2020, Jokubaitis made his senior national team debut for Lithuania during EuroBasket qualification. In June and July 2021, he played at the FIBA Olympic Qualifying Tournament in Kaunas.

Personal life
Jokubaitis' father, played professional basketball in Lithuania and Poland. His mother and sister also played the sport.

On 12 December 2020, a man was arrested in Vilnius after scamming €10,000 from a woman he had dated for months by impersonating Jokubaitis.

Career statistics

EuroLeague

|-
| style="text-align:left;"| 2018–19
| style="text-align:left;"| Žalgiris
| 12 || 0 || 5.8 || .500 || .200 || .800 || .5 || .6 || .0 || .1 || 2.6 || 1.9
|-
| style="text-align:left;"| 2019–20
| style="text-align:left;"| Žalgiris
| 10 || 0 || 6.4 || .444 || .500 || .750 || .5 || 1.3 || .3 || .0 || 2.2 || 2.0
|-
| style="text-align:left;"| 2020–21
| style="text-align:left;"| Žalgiris
| 31 || 5 || 20.9 || .454 || .388 || .756 || 1.7 || 2.5 || .5 || .0 || 7.0 || 6.8
|-
| style="text-align:left;"| 2021–22
| style="text-align:left;"| Barcelona
| 37 || 2 || 16.7 || .563 || .568 || .714 || 1.6 || 2.6 || .4 || .0 || 7.1 || 7.5

References

External links
Rokas Jokubaitis at Euroleague.net

2000 births
Living people
BC Žalgiris players
BC Žalgiris-2 players
FC Barcelona Bàsquet players
Liga ACB players
Lithuanian men's basketball players
Oklahoma City Thunder draft picks
People from Mažeikiai
Point guards